Jacinto Convit is a 2013 documentary film directed by Sergio Monsalve. The documentary focuses on the homonymous Jacinto Convit, a Venezuelan physician and scientist known for developing a vaccine to prevent leprosy and his studies to treat cancer. It was screened at the XI Venezuelan Film Festival in 2015. Jacinto Convit  was Sergio Monsalve's directorial debut.

References

External links 

 
 Full documentary at YouTube (Vale TV Canal 5)

2010s Spanish-language films
Films shot in Venezuela
2013 documentary films
2013 films
Documentary films about science
Venezuelan documentary films
2013 directorial debut films